The following is a timeline of the history of the city of Gdańsk, Poland.

Middle Ages

 c. VII century - Settlement is established on the Motława river.
 c. X century - Gdańsk becomes a defensive fort for Kashubian dukes.
 997 - Saint Adalbert baptises the citizens of urbs Gyddannyzc. 
 1013 - Poland loses influence over the region.
 1047 - Casimir I takes back control over Gdańsk.
 1186 - Cistercians establish a monastery in Oliwa.
 1216 - Swiętopełk II takes control of Pomerania.
 1224 - Gdańsk granted city rights.
 1227 - Dominican Monastery founded in Gdańsk.
 1253 - Oliwa is raided by the Teutonic Order.
 1260 - St. Dominic's Fair begins.
 1263 - The village of Wrzeszcz, today's borough of Gdańsk, mentioned for the first time.
 1271 - First mention of Polanki and Przymorze.
 1294, 1295 - Visits of Polish King Przemysł II.
 1308 - November 13: Teutonic takeover of Gdańsk.
 1325 - Brzeźno is mentioned for the first time.
 1326 - St. Catherine's Church built.
 1327 - Construction of the Gdańsk Town Hall begins.
 1343 - Casimir III the Great agrees to give Pomerelia to the Teutonic order.
 1346 - Gaol Tower built.
 1350 - Artus Court built (approximate date).
 1360 - City joins Hanseatic League (approximate date).
 1391 - Foundation of the Marienbrunn Abbey.
 1410 - The city recognized Polish King Władysław II Jagiełło as rightful ruler, but the next year it came under Teutonic rule again.
 1416 - A revolt against the local government happens due to its weak management.
 1440 - City joins the anti-Teutonic Prussian Confederation.
 1454
 11 February: Townspeople captured the local castle.
 6 March: City reincorporated to the Kingdom of Poland by King Casimir IV Jagiellon upon the request of the Prussian Confederation.
 March: City authorized by the Polish king to mint Polish coins.
 June: City solemnly pledged allegiance to the King in Elbląg, recognizing the Teutonic annexation and rule as unlawful.
 1455 - Danzig law in effect (approximate date).
 1458 - Truce between Poland and Denmark signed, after Denmark initially sided with the Teutonic Knights in the Thirteen Years' War (1454–1466).
 1463 - The fleets of Elbląg and Gdańsk defeat the Teutonics on the Vistula Lagoon.
 1465 - St. John's Church built.
 1481 - Artus Court rebuilt.
 1494 - Hall of the Brotherhood of St. George built.

16th to 18th centuries
 1502 - St. Mary's Church completed.
 1514 - Trinity Church built.
 1520 - During the Polish-Teutonic War, the Landsknecht coordinated an attack on Gdańsk.
 1525 - The Gdańsk Tumult - Lutherans organise a revolt against mayor Eberhard Ferber. 
 1526
 January - The council is overthrown by the revolt.
 April - King Sigismund I enters the city with eight thousand men, executing the rebels and asserting his power over the region. 
 1537 - Franz Rhode sets up printing press.
 1557 - Sigismund II grants Protestants equal rights.
 1558 - Academic Gymnasium established.
 1561 - Main Town Hall tower built, with a gilded statue of Polish King Sigismund II Augustus placed at its top.
 1568 - Green Gate built.
 1569
 City becomes part of Polish–Lithuanian Commonwealth.
 Mennonite Church founded.
 1575 - Danzig rebellion begins.
 1577
 April 17: Battle of Lubieszów.
 Siege of Danzig by Stephen Báthory of Poland.
 1588 - Highland Gate erected.
 1594 - Oliwa Cathedral consecrated.
 1596 - Bibliotheca Senatus Gedanensis established.
 1605 - Arsenal built at the Coal Market Square.
 1606 - Der Lachs distillery in business.
 1614 - Golden Gate built.
 1627 - Battle of Oliwa during the Polish–Swedish War (1626–1629), won by Poland.
 1633 - Neptune's Fountain installed at the Long Market.
 1640 - Jan Heweliusz established his astronomical observatory in the Old Town.
 1655 - Deluge (Swedish invasion of Poland): Siege of Danzig (1655–1660) begins.
 1660 - Treaty of Oliva signed.
 1681 - Royal Chapel of the Polish King John III Sobieski built.
 1703–1711 - Large scale arms smuggling for Hungarian insurgents during the Rákóczi's War of Independence against Austria.
 1709 - Bubonic plague.
 1711–1712 - Stay of Hungarian national hero Francis II Rákóczi in the city following the Rákóczi's War of Independence.

 1734 - Siege of Danzig by Russians during the War of the Polish Succession.
 1742
 Experimental Physics Society organized.
 Corn exchange opens in Artus Court.
 1756 - Abbot's Palace expanded.
 1772 - After the First Partition of Poland the city became separated from the rest of Poland, it remained a Polish exclave.
 1793
 Second Partition of Poland - city annexed by Prussia.
 Municipal Library established.
 1797 - Attempt of student uprising against Prussia, crushed quickly by the Prussian authorities.

19th century

 1807
 March 19-May 24: Siege of Danzig by French-Polish-Italian-Saxon-Baden forces.
 September 9: Free City of Danzig established by Napoleon.
 1813 - January–December 29: Siege of Danzig by Russian and Prussian forces.
 1814 - City becomes part of Prussia again.
 1815 - City becomes administrative capital of Danzig (region).
 1832 - Handelsakademie established.
 1852 - Königliche Werft Danzig in business.
 1871
 City becomes part of German Empire.
 Franciscan monastery building restored.
 1880 - Westpreussische Provinzial-Museum opens.
 1885 - Population: 114,805.
 1887 - Great Synagogue built.
 1896 - Old fortifications dismantled in north and west of city.
 1899 - Harbor built at Neufahrwasser (Nowy Port).
 1900 - Main railway station opens.

20th century

1900–1939
 1901
 Königliche Staatsarchiv für Westpreussen (National Archives) opens.
 House of the Sheriffs restored.
 1903 - Fußball Club Danzig formed.
 1904 - Königliche Technische Hochschule founded.
 1905 - Population: 159,088.
 1918 - City becomes part of Weimar Germany.
 1919 - Free City of Danzig created by Treaty of Versailles.

 1920
 Polish Post Office and Sportverein Schutzpolizei Danzig established.
 Volkstag (parliament) becomes active.
 1921 - Danziger Werft in business.
 1922 - Gedania Danzig football club formed.
 1927 - MOSiR Stadium built.
 1937
 Mass anti-Polish discrimination by Germans: employing Poles by German companies prohibited, already employed Poles fired.
 October: Pogrom against Jews by the Germans.
 1938, May 3: Over 100 German attacks on Polish homes on the day of the Polish 3 May Constitution Day.
 1939
 March: Ban and mass requisition of Polish press.
 SS Heimwehr Danzig and SS Wachsturmbann "Eimann" units of the SS established by the Germans.

World War II (1939–1945)

 1939
 September 1: Battle of the Danzig Bay; Defense of the Polish Post Office in Danzig.
 September 1–7: Battle of Westerplatte.
 October 5: The Germans executed 39 Polish defenders of the Polish Post Office in the present-day district of Zaspa.
 October 8: City occupied by Nazi Germany; city becomes capital of Reichsgau Danzig-West Prussia.
 October: The Germans established a Nazi camp for Romani people.
 1940 - The Germans established two subcamps of the Stutthof concentration camp in Westerplatte and Suchanino.
 1941
 Lufttwaffensportverein Danzig formed.
 The subcamps of the Stutthof concentration camp in Maćkowy and Westerplatte were dissolved.
 1943–1944 - The local Polish resistance movement facilitated escapes of endangered Polish resistance members and British prisoners of war who fled from German POW camps via the city's port to neutral Sweden.
 1944
 August 26: The Germans established a subcamp of the Stutthof concentration camp at the main shipyard.
 September 13: The Germans established a subcamp of the Stutthof concentration camp at the Schichau shipyard.
 October 16: The Germans established a subcamp of the Stutthof concentration camp on the Ostrów Island.
 1945
 February: Most prisoners of the Schichau subcamp of the Stutthof concentration camp were evacuated towards Lębork, while some were sent back to Stutthof main camp; subcamp dissolved.
 March: The subcamps of the Stutthof concentration camp at the main shipyard and Ostrów Island were dissolved.
 March 27–30: City taken by forces of Soviet Union.
 Gdańsk becomes part of Republic of Poland.

1945–1990s
 1945
 City becomes capital of Gdańsk Voivodeship.
 Franciszek Kotus-Jankowski becomes mayor.
 Gdańsk Shipyard, Akademia Lekarska, Baltia Gdańsk (Lechia Gdańsk) and Stoczniowiec Gdańsk football clubs, Gdańsk Symphony Orchestra, and Academy of Fine Arts established.
 1945-1946 Expulsion of the city's German-speaking majority in accordance with the Potsdam Agreement.
 1946
 August 28: Execution of Danuta Siedzikówna and Feliks Selmanowicz, members of the Polish resistance movement in World War II and the anti-communist resistance movement, Polish national heroes, by the communists.
 October 1: Gdańsk College of Education established.
 1949 - Four transports of Greeks and Macedonians, refugees of the Greek Civil War, arrived at the port of Gdańsk, from where they were transported to new homes in Poland.
 1951 - Wybrzeże Gdańsk handball team established.

 1952 - City becomes part of Polish People's Republic.
 1953
 Baltic State Opera and Philharmonic formed.
 Stoczniowiec Gdańsk ice hockey team established.
 1956
 1 May: Lechia Gdańsk rugby union team established.
 Manifestation of support for the Hungarian Revolution of 1956. Mass raising of funds, medical supplies and blood donation for Hungarian insurgents.
 1957 - Wybrzeże Gdańsk motorcycle speedway team established.
 1960 - Lechia Gdańsk wins its first Polish rugby championship.
 1962 - National Maritime Museum established.
 1963 - Gdańsk hosts the 1963 World Fencing Championships.
 1965 - Abbot's Palace rebuilt.
 1966
 Wybrzeże Gdańsk wins its first Polish handball championship.
 Westerplatte Monument unveiled.
 1970
 University of Gdańsk established.
 Gdańsk Power Station commissioned.
 Hala Olivia arena opens.
 1972 - National Museum, Gdańsk established.
 1974
 Airport opens.
 Population: 402,200.
 1977 - Monument of Polish poet Maria Konopnicka unveiled.
 1979
 Museum of the Polish Post (Muzeum Poczty Polskiej) established at the site of the 1939 defence of the Polish Post Office.
 Defenders of the Polish Post Office Monument unveiled.
 1980
 Summer: Shipbuilders strike.
 August 31: Solidarity (Polish trade union) founded; Gdańsk Agreement signed.
 Monument to the Fallen Shipyard Workers of 1970 unveiled.
 1982 - August 31: Anti-government demonstration.
 1985 - SS Soldek museum opens.
 1989 - City becomes part of Republic of Poland.

 1991 - Franciszek Jamroż becomes mayor.
 1993 - Gdańsk Shakespeare Days begin.
 1994
 May: Gdańsk hosts the 1994 European Judo Championships.
 July: Tomasz Posadzki becomes mayor.
 1996 - International Festival of Street & Open-Air Theatres begins (approximate date).
 1997 - Gdańsk hosts the 1997 European Fencing Championships.
 1998
 Paweł Adamowicz becomes mayor.
 Łaźnia Centre for Contemporary Art founded.
 1999
 Gdańsk becomes capital of Pomeranian Voivodeship.
 Solidarity Centre Foundation established.

21st century
 2001
 Wybrzeże Gdańsk wins its tenth Polish handball championship.
 Third Millennium John Paul II Bridge opens.
 2002
 The Monument Cemetery of the Lost Cemeteries installed.
 Lechia Gdańsk wins its tenth Polish rugby championship.
 2004 - May 1: Poland becomes part of European Union.
 2005 - Trefl Gdańsk volleyball team established.
 2007
 Deepwater Container Terminal Gdańsk launched.
 Tricity Charter signed.

 2009 - Gdańsk co-hosts the EuroBasket 2009.
 2010
 Ergo Arena opens.
 Population: 455,830.
 2011
 Baltic Arena opens.
 October: Gdańsk hosts the 2011 European Table Tennis Championships.
 2012 - Gdańsk co-hosts the UEFA Euro 2012.
 2013 - Gdańsk co-hosts the 2013 Men's European Volleyball Championship.
 2014
 August: European Solidarity Centre opens.
 September: Gdańsk co-hosts the 2014 FIVB Volleyball Men's World Championship.
 September: Gdańsk Shakespeare Theatre opens.
 2015
 August 30: Monument of Danuta Siedzikówna unveiled in the Orunia district.
 December: Honorary Consulate of Bulgaria opened.

 2016
 January: Gdańsk co-hosts the 2016 European Men's Handball Championship.
 August 28: State burial of Polish national heroes Danuta Siedzikówna and Feliks Selmanowicz in the 70th anniversary of their execution.
 2017
 March: Museum of the Second World War opened.
 Gdańsk co-hosts the 2017 Men's European Volleyball Championship.
 2018 - Cursed soldiers monument unveiled.
 2019
 10 May: Monument to the victims of the Ponary massacre unveiled.
 17 September: Witold Pilecki monument unveiled.
 2020
 June: Medieval Pietas Domini altar, stolen by Germany during World War II, restored from Berlin to the St. Mary's Church in Gdańsk.
 22 October: Consulate-General of Hungary opened.
 2021 - Gdańsk co-hosts the 2021 Men's European Volleyball Championship.

See also
 History of Gdańsk
 List of mayors of Danzig, 1308 to 1945
 List of mayors of Gdańsk, pre-1308 and post-1945
 List of Gdańsk aristocratic families
 Category:Timelines of cities in Poland (in Polish)

References

This article incorporates information from the Polish Wikipedia.

Bibliography

In English

In other languages

External links

 Links to fulltext city directories for Gdansk via Wikisource
 Europeana. Items related to Gdansk, various dates.
 Digital Public Library of America. Items related to Gdansk, various dates
 

 
Gdansk
gdansk
Years in Poland